The 1995 French Figure Skating Championships took place in December 1994 in Bordeaux for singles and pairs and in Besançon for ice dance. Skaters competed in the disciplines of men's singles, women's singles, pair skating, and ice dancing on the senior level. The event was used to help determine the French team to the 1995 World Championships and the 1995 European Championships.

Results

Men

Ladies

Pairs

Ice dance

External links
 French article

1994 in figure skating
French Figure Skating Championships, 1995
French Figure Skating Championships
1995 in French sport